The 2017 FIBA Under-19 Basketball World Cup (Arabic: 2017 كأس العالم لكرة السلة تحت 19 سنة فيبا) was the 13th edition of the FIBA Under-19 Basketball World Cup, the biennial international men's youth basketball championship contested by the U19 national teams of the member associations of FIBA. It was held in Cairo, Egypt from 1 to 9 July 2017.

Canada won the gold medal by defeating Italy in the final match 79–60. This marked Canada's best ever international FIBA tournament finish in any event.

Venue

Qualified teams

* Brazil qualified for the tournament but was suspended by FIBA. A fourth team from FIBA Americas had to be named to take Brazil's place. The draw took place on 12 May 2017, where Argentina was chosen to replace Brazil.

Preliminary round
The draw for the tournament was held on 11 February 2017 in Cairo, Egypt.

Group A

Group B

Group C

Group D

Knockout stage

Bracket

5–8th place bracket

9–16th place bracket

13–16th place bracket

Round of 16

9–16th place quarterfinals

Quarterfinals

13–16th place semifinals

9–12th place semifinals

5–8th place semifinals

Semifinals

15th place game

13th place game

Eleventh place game

Ninth place game

Seventh place game

Fifth place game

Bronze medal match

Final

Final standings

Statistics and awards

Statistical leaders

Points

Rebounds

Assists

Blocks

Steals

Awards

All-Tournament Team
 Payton Pritchard
 R. J. Barrett
 Lorenzo Bucarelli
 Tommaso Oxilia
 Abu Kigab

References

External links
Official website

2017
2017 in basketball
2017 in Egyptian sport
International basketball competitions hosted by Egypt
July 2017 sports events in Africa